Corrodians were in essence pensioners who lived in monasteries or nunneries. They were usually well-to-do elderly lay people who paid or were sponsored for accommodation and food for the rest of their lives. This payment might be in cash but would more usually be by donating land to the abbey in question. If they were men with no heirs, the whole estate could be granted to the abbey; otherwise they might 'retire' from the running of their estates and leave that to their heirs, but apportion a part that was not entailed for the abbey.

This was a way for abbeys to gain income, especially in their later days in England, when their numbers were in decline so they had space to accommodate pensioners and less money coming as dowers from new entrants to the orders.

References

Retirement
Christian monasticism